Hutton Roof may refer to:

 Hutton Roof, Eden, in Cumbria, England
 Hutton Roof, South Lakeland, in Cumbria, England